Wittington Investments Limited is a privately owned British holding company. It was incorporated in 1941 and is based in London, England.

The company is 79.2% owned by the Garfield Weston Foundation, one of the United Kingdom's largest grant-making trusts, which was established in 1958 by Canadian businessman W. Garfield Weston (1898–1978), and 20.8% owned by members of the prominent Weston family. As of 5 April 2008, the trustees of the Garfield Weston Foundation valued their 79.2% stake in Wittington Investments at £3.62 billion.

Holdings
Wittington Investments owns 54.5% of Associated British Foods, one of the largest food companies in the world and the parent company of Primark, the largest discount clothing chain in the UK and Ireland. Associated British Foods also owns British Sugar, processor of the entire UK beet crop and producer of half the UK consumption of sugar. Further assets include ownership of the British department store Fortnum & Mason, as well as Heal's, a chain of homeware and furnishing stores in the UK.

Canadian company
There is a similarly-named company in Canada called "Wittington Investments, Limited", which controls George Weston Limited. It was founded by W. Garfield Weston in 1952 and is based in Toronto, Ontario, Canada. In December 2020, the Weston family announced that Galen Weston Jr. had succeeded his father (Galen Weston Sr.) as the controlling shareholder of Wittington Investments, Limited.

This company was the owner of the Selfridges Group of department store chains, including Selfridges in the UK, Brown Thomas and Arnotts in Ireland, and De Bijenkorf in the Netherlands. In December 2021, it was reported that the majority of the Selfridges Group's assets were being sold for around £4 billion to a joint venture between Thai conglomerate Central Group and Austrian firm Signa Holding.

References

External links
Website of Wittington Investments Limited (British company) 
Webpage of Wittington Investments, Limited (Canadian company)
2009 report of the Garfield Weston Foundation (see page 15 for details of the ownership and assets of Wittington Investments Limited)

Companies based in the City of Westminster
Privately held companies based in London
Privately held companies of England
Privately held companies of the United Kingdom
Investment companies of the United Kingdom
Family-owned companies of the United Kingdom
Weston family
Fortnum & Mason